The following railroads operate(d) in the U.S. state of Virginia.

Common freight carriers
Buckingham Branch Railroad (BB)
Canadian Pacific Railway (CP) through subsidiary Delaware and Hudson Railway (DH) (trackage rights, not used)
Chesapeake and Albemarle Railroad (CA)
Commonwealth Railway (CWRY)
CSX Transportation (CSXT)
Delmarva Central Railroad (DCR)
Durbin and Greenbrier Valley Railroad (DGVR) operates Shenandoah Valley Railroad (SV)
North Carolina and Virginia Railroad (NCVA)
Norfolk and Portsmouth Belt Line Railroad (NPB)
Norfolk Southern Railway (NS)

Passenger carriers

Amtrak (AMTK)
Busch Gardens Railway (located in Busch Gardens Williamsburg)
The Tide
Virginia Railway Express
Washington Metro

Private carriers
Fort Eustis Military Railroad (USAX)
Newport News Shipbuilding & Dry Dock Company (NNSX)
Norfolk Naval Shipyard (USNX)

Defunct railroads
Note: railroads that existed only in present-day West Virginia before 1863 are not listed.

Electric
Appalachian Power Company
Alexandria, Barcroft and Washington Transit Company
Blue Ridge Light and Power Company
Charlottesville and Albemarle Railway
Chesapeake Transit Company
Citizens Railway, Light and Power Company
Danville Traction and Power Company
Great Falls and Old Dominion Railroad
Hampton Roads Traction Company
Lynchburg Traction and Light Company
Mill Mountain Incline
Mount Vernon, Alexandria and Washington Railway
Newport News and Old Point Railway and Electric Company
Norfolk Railway and Light Company
Norfolk City and Suburban Railway
Norfolk and Ocean View Railroad and Hotel Company
Norfolk and Ocean View Railway
Norfolk Southern Railroad
Norfolk and Southern Railroad
Norfolk Street Railroad
Radford Water Power Company
Richmond and Chesapeake Bay Railway
Richmond and Henrico Railway
Richmond and Rappahannock River Railway
Richmond-Ashland Railway
Richmond-Petersburg Interurban Electric Railway
Roanoke Railway and Electric Company
Schuyler Railway
Tazewell Street Railway

Virginia Railway and Power Company
Washington, Alexandria and Mount Vernon Railway
Washington and Old Dominion Railroad
Washington and Old Dominion Railway
Washington Utilities Company
Washington-Virginia Railway

Private carriers
Centreville Military Railroad
Lorton and Occoquan Railroad
Suffolk Lumber Company's Railroad
United States Military Railroad

Notes

See also
List of railroad lines in the Delmarva Peninsula

External links
Virginia Department of Rail and Public Transportation official website
Virginia Association of Railroads official website

 
 
Virginia
Railroads